Cornelia is an underground station on Line A of the Rome Metro. It is located at the junction of Via di Boccea and the Circonvallazione Cornelia, from which it takes its name. The station was inaugurated on 1 January 2000.

Services
This station has:
 Access for the disabled
 Escalators
 Bus terminus

Escalators
Cornelia is known for its sets of escalators on three levels which are used to enter and exit the station.  One escalator is a rarely seen 'narrow style' which runs alongside two average sized escalators. There is another of its type at Spagna station, also on Line A.

Located Nearby
 Via Boccea
 Forte Boccea
 Piazza San Giovanni Battista de la Salle

References

External links

 Cornelia station on the Rome public transport site (in Italian)

Rome Metro Line A stations
Railway stations opened in 2000
2000 establishments in Italy
Rome Q. XIII Aurelio
Rome Q. XXVII Primavalle
Rome S. IX Aurelio
Railway stations in Italy opened in the 21st century